John Olulu (20 May 1944 – 17 March 1972) was a Kenyan boxer. He competed at the 1964 Summer Olympics and the 1968 Summer Olympics. At the 1968 Summer Olympics, he lost to Arto Nilsson of Finland.

References

1944 births
1972 deaths
Kenyan male boxers
Olympic boxers of Kenya
Boxers at the 1964 Summer Olympics
Boxers at the 1968 Summer Olympics
People from Kitui County
Commonwealth Games medallists in boxing
Boxers at the 1970 British Commonwealth Games
Commonwealth Games silver medallists for Kenya
Light-welterweight boxers
Medallists at the 1970 British Commonwealth Games